Henri Boucherat (? – died after 1922) was a French playwright and chansonnier.

Works 
1884: Mon ami Pierrot, review of the year 1884
1885: Théodora à Montluçon, one-act parody in eight tableaux, with Guillaume Livet
1898: Le Diable au moulin, one-act operetta, with Henry Moreau
1898: Métempsycose ! Lettre à une parisienne, music by Laurent Halet
1898: Y a pas d'erreur, revue in two acts and four tableaux, with Moreau
1898: Filles d'Arles ! Souvenirs de Province, song, with Jules Gaillard, music by Étienne Jacquier
1900: Le Medjidié, one-act vaudeville, with Moreau
1900: Ohé ! la Province, vaudeville-revue in 1 act and two tableaux, with Moreau

References

External links 
 Worldcat

19th-century French dramatists and playwrights
French chansonniers
year of birth missing
year of death missing